John Wagambie is Papua New Guinea Kumul (#14) and coached the Papua New Guinea Kumuls in the 1980s.

References

Papua New Guinea national rugby league team captains
Papua New Guinea national rugby league team coaches
Papua New Guinea national rugby league team players
Papua New Guinean rugby league coaches
Papua New Guinean rugby league players
Possibly living people
Rugby league five-eighths
Rugby league locks
Year of birth missing